Legionella nagasakiensis is a Gram-negative bacterium from the genus Legionella which was isolated from a sample of hot spring water in Aomori in Japan and from human lung tissue. It is catalase-positive and rod-shaped, with a single polar flagellum.

References

External links
Type strain of Legionella nagasakiensis at BacDive -  the Bacterial Diversity Metadatabase

Legionellales
Bacteria described in 2012